Staurogyne sichuanica is a species of plant in the family Acanthaceae. It is endemic to China.

References

Flora of China
sichuanica
Endangered plants
Taxonomy articles created by Polbot